Three Stripes is the fourth studio album by R&B group, Bell Biv DeVoe, their first recording since 2001's BBD. The album was preceded by the lead single "Run", which reached the top 10 on the Urban A/C chart, as well as their collaboration with SWV on "Finally". It also includes the single "I'm Betta" produced by Kay Gee of Naughty by Nature.

The album is the combined effort of all three of the group's original members; Michael Bivins, Ricky Bell, and Ronnie DeVoe. The group continues to tour as part of New Edition.

Track listing 
 "Ready" (featuring Doug E. Fresh) – 1:05
 "Find a Way" – 3:43
 "I'm Betta" – 3:49
 "Hot Damn" – 3:01
 "Run" – 3:37
 "All Dat There" – 3:51
 "Don't Go" – 3:45
 "Finally" (featuring SWV) – 3:38
 "One More Try" (featuring Boyz II Men) – 4:30
 "Incredible" – 4:00

Charts

References 

2017 albums
Bell Biv DeVoe albums